The 2017 Can-Am Duels are a pair of Monster Energy NASCAR Cup Series stock car races held on February 23, 2017, at Daytona International Speedway in Daytona Beach, Florida. Both contested over 60 laps, they were the qualifying races for the 2017 Daytona 500.

Report

Background

Daytona International Speedway is one of six superspeedways to hold NASCAR races, the others being Michigan International Speedway, Auto Club Speedway, Indianapolis Motor Speedway, Pocono Raceway and Talladega Superspeedway. The track's turns are banked at 31 degrees, while the front stretch, the location of the finish line, is banked at 18 degrees.

Practice

First practice

Qualifying
He said afterwards that everyone at Hendrick Motorsports did "a lot of work this off-season. This team definitely has a knack for these plate tracks, as they showed with Jeff Gordon and then last year with here and Talladega." He also mentioned how these accomplishments don't "just happen by staying the same, as everybody knows. Everyone is always trying to get better and make their cars better and faster, and the engine shop is always finding new things. So I think that's just proof that they're improving with everybody else and taking that next step, which is really impressive." He ended by saying he was "happy to be a part of it, and hopefully we can run good next Sunday."

Qualifying results

Practice (post–Qualifying)
Both practice sessions scheduled for Thursday following qualifying was cancelled due to rain.

Duels

Duel 1

First half
Chase Elliott led the field to the green flag at 7:19 p.m. He side-drafted Brad Keselowski on the backstretch to jump in front and lead the first lap. Keselowski dove under him in Turn 2 to take the lead the following lap. While he was leading, teammate Joey Logano made an unscheduled stop on lap 12 for a flat tire and rejoined a lap down. Kyle Busch took the lead as the first caution of the race, a scheduled competition caution due to rain showers, flew on lap 25. Everyone pitted under the caution and Busch retained the lead. Matt DiBenedetto restarted from the tail-end of the field for speeding on pit road.

Second half
The race restarted on lap 31. When the field reached the backstretch, Keselowski powered by Busch on the outside lane to take back the lead. Elliott dove inside Keselowski in Turn 2 to retake the lead on lap 37. The second caution flew with 12 laps to go for a two-car wreck on the frontstretch. Coming through the tri-oval heading towards Turn 1, Corey LaJoie rear-ended Reed Sorenson, who checked up, turning Sorenson down into Paul Menard, sending Sorenson down the track and into the inside retaining wall. Sorenson, who missed the race as a result of this wreck, said he guessed LaJoie "felt like he did what he had to do to make the race. I hope he's proud of that part of it. There's a lot of pressure going in to making this race. It's a very big deal for a small team like ours." Sorenson went on to finish last.

The race restarted with eight laps to go. The Fords of Kevin Harvick and Keselowski formed a line on the top side to make a charge at Elliott. The line started stalling out with five laps to go and Elliott drove on to score the victory, only challenged by Harvick and Jamie McMurray.

Duel 1 results

Duel 2

First half
Dale Earnhardt Jr. led the field to the green flag at 8:51 p.m. He and Denny Hamlin raced side-by-side for the lead for five laps before the field settled into a single-file train running against the wall. The race flow was broken up by the lap 26 competition caution, also scheduled due to earlier rain showers. Everyone pitted under the caution and Ryan Blaney exited pit road with the race lead. Hamlin (speeding) and Elliott Sadler (driving through too many pit boxes) restarted the race from the tail-end of the field.

Second half
The race restarted on lap 31 and Earnhardt wasted little time taking the lead back from Blaney. Unlike the first Duel race, this race was more calm and reserved. Action started picking up with 18 laps to go when Jimmie Johnson made contact with Blaney on the backstretch, forcing Blaney into the outside wall. Five laps later, Johnson suffered a right-side tire blowout on the backstretch and slammed the wall in Turn 3, bringing out the second caution.

The race restarted with nine to go. On the final lap, Hamlin received a push from Austin Dillon, faked Earnhardt out on the backstretch and passed him going into Turn 3 to win the second Duel race.

Duel 2 results

Media

Television

Radio

References

Can-Am Duels
Can-Am Duels
Can-Am Duels
NASCAR races at Daytona International Speedway